The Kilkenomics Comedy and Economic Festival is an economics and comedy festival in Kilkenny, Ireland, the brainchild of David McWilliams and Richard Cook. Its first session ran from 11 to 14 November 2010.

The festival mocks banking and political figures. The festival also features its own currency known as "the marble".

See also
 Cat Laughs

References

External links

 Kilkenomics Homepage
 Kilkenomics brochure

Comedy festivals in Ireland
Culture in County Kilkenny
Economics organizations